James B. Carrell (born 1940) is an American and Canadian mathematician, who is currently an emeritus professor of mathematics at the University of British Columbia, Vancouver, British Columbia, Canada. His areas of research are algebraic geometry, Lie theory, transformation groups and differential geometry.

He obtained his Ph.D. at the University of Washington (Seattle) under the supervision of Allendoefer. In 1971 together with Jean Dieudonné he received the Leroy P. Steele Prize for the article Invariant theory, old and new.

He proved theorems in Schubert calculus about singularities of Schubert varieties. The Carrell–Liebermann theorem on the zero set of a holomorphic vector field is used in complex algebraic geometry.

He is a fellow of the American Mathematical Society.

References

External links 
 Jim Carrell at math.ubc.ca
 Jim Carrell in ca.linkedin.com

1940 births
Living people
20th-century American mathematicians
21st-century American mathematicians
People from Seattle
Canadian mathematicians
University of Washington College of Arts and Sciences alumni
Academic staff of the University of British Columbia Faculty of Science
Geometers
Fellows of the American Mathematical Society
American emigrants to Canada